Art in Manila was an American indie rock "supergroup" consisting primarily of musicians based in the Midwestern states of Nebraska and Kansas.  After originally forming with the name Art Bell (after the American broadcaster and author), the band later changed its name.  Their album Set the Woods On Fire (2007) was recorded by Joel Petersen (The Faint, Broken Spindles) and mixed by Andy LeMaster (Now It's Overhead).  At the time the album was recorded, the band consisted of Steve Bartolomei (Mal Madrigal), Corey Broman (Dance Me Pregnant), Orenda Fink (Azure Ray), Ryan Fox (The Good Life), Dan McCarthy (McCarthy Trenching), and Adrianne Verhoeven (The Anniversary); former members include Stefanie Drootin (The Good Life) and Chris Senseney (Big Harp).

Band members
Steve Bartolomei: guitar
Corey Broman: drums, percussion
Orenda Fink: vocals, guitar, trumpet
Ryan Fox: bass guitar
Dan McCarthy: keyboards, accordion, guitar
Adrianne Verhoeven: vocals, keyboards, percussion

Discography
Set the Woods on Fire (2007, Saddle Creek Records)

References

External links
Art in Manila on Myspace
Saddle Creek Records

Indie rock musical groups from Nebraska
Saddle Creek Records artists